The megas doux ("grand duke") was one of the highest positions in the hierarchy of the later Byzantine Empire, denoting the commander-in-chief of the Byzantine navy. It is sometimes also given in English by the half-Latinizations megaduke or megadux. The Greek word δούξ is the Hellenized form of the Latin term dux, meaning leader or commander.

History and functions 
The office was initially created by Alexios I Komnenos, who reformed the derelict Byzantine navy and amalgamated the remnants of its various provincial squadrons into a unified force under the megas doux. The Emperor's brother-in-law John Doukas is usually considered to have been the first to hold the title, being raised to it in 1092, when he was tasked with suppressing the Turkish emir Tzachas. There is however a document dated to December 1085, where a monk Niketas signs as supervisor of the estates of an unnamed megas doux. The office of "doux [commander] of the fleet" (doux tou stolou), with similar responsibilities and hence perhaps a precursor of the office of megas doux, is also mentioned at the time, being given  to Manuel Boutoumites and in 1090 to Constantine Dalassenos.

John Doukas, the first known megas doux, led campaigns on both land and sea and was responsible for the re-establishment of firm Byzantine control over the Aegean and the islands of Crete and Cyprus in the years 1092–93 and over western Anatolia in 1097. From this time the megas doux was also given overall control of the provinces of Hellas, the Peloponnese and Crete, which chiefly provided the manpower and resources for the fleet. However, since the megas doux was one of the Empire's senior officials, and mostly involved with the central government and various military campaigns, de factο governance of these provinces rested with the provinces' praitōr and various local leaders. During the 12th century, the post of megas doux was dominated by the Kontostephanos family; one of its members, Andronikos Kontostephanos, was one of the most important officers of Emperor Manuel I Komnenos, assisting him in achieving many land and naval victories.

With the virtual disappearance of the Byzantine fleet after the Fourth Crusade, the title was retained as an honorific in the Empire of Nicaea. Michael VIII Palaiologos assumed the title when he became regent for John IV Laskaris, before being raised to senior co-emperor. His descendants inherited the title and the rule of Lemnos until evicted by the Byzantines in 1278.

After the Byzantine recovery of Constantinople in 1261, the title reverted to its old function as commander-in-chief of the navy, and remained a high rank for the remainder of the empire, its holder ranking sixth after the emperor, between the prōtovestiarios and the prōtostratōr. As such, it was also sometimes conferred upon foreigners in imperial service, the most notable among these being the Italian Licario, who recovered many Aegean islands for Emperor Michael VIII, and Roger de Flor, head of the Catalan Company. The mid-14th century Book of Offices of Pseudo-Kodinos lists the insignia of the megas doux as a golden-red skiadion hat decorated with embroideries in the klapoton style, without veil. Alternatively, a domed skaranikon hat could be worn, again in red and gold and decorated with golden wire, with a portrait of the emperor standing in front, and another of him enthroned in the rear. The megas doux also wore a rich silk tunic, the kabbadion, and could choose the fabric himself "from those that are in use". His staff of office (dikanikion) featured carved knots and knobs in gold, bordered with silver braid. Pseudo-Kodinos also records that, while the other warships flew "the usual imperial flag" of the cross and the firesteels, the flagship of the megas doux flew an image of the emperor on horseback. His subordinate officials were the megas droungarios tou stolou, the amēralios, the prōtokomēs, the junior droungarioi, and the junior komētes.

The Serbian Empire, established in 1346 by Tsar Stefan Dushan, adopted various Byzantine titles, among them that of megas doux, which became the "grand voivode" (veliki vojvoda), albeit without any naval connotations. Holders of the office included senior noblemen such as Jovan Uglješa and Jovan Oliver.

List of known holders

Byzantine Empire

Empire of Trebizond

Cultural references 
In the 1490 Valencian epic romance Tirant lo Blanc, the valiant knight Tirant the White from Brittany travels to Constantinople and becomes a Byzantine megadux. This story has no basis in actual history, though it may reflect the above-mentioned cases of the office being conferred upon foreigners.

References

Sources 

 
 
 
 
 
 
 
 
 
 
 
 
 
 

Byzantine military offices
Byzantine navy
Military ranks of ancient Rome
Late Roman military ranks